Following is a list of notable people associated with the Cornish College of the Arts, located in the American city of Seattle, Washington.

Presidents

 Nellie Cornish (1914–1939)
 Melvin Strauss (1975–1985)
 Robert N. Funk (1985–1994)
  Sergei P. Tschernisch (1994–2011)
 Nancy Uscher (since 2011)

Notable faculty

Music 

Guy Anderson
Eric Banks
Vicki Boeckman
John Cage
Jay Clayton
Corigliano Quartet (artist-in-residence)
Chuck Deardorf
Christopher DeLaurenti
Jody Diamond (artist-in-residence)
Robert Dick (artist-in-residence)
Bill Frisell (artist-in-residence)
Janice Giteck
Randy Halberstadt
Lou Harrison (artist-in-residence)
Bern Herbolsheimer
Wayne Horvitz
Laura Kaminsky
Bun-Ching Lam
Art Lande
Rudresh Mahanthappa (artist-in-residence)
Ingrid Matthews
Myra Melford (artist-in-residence)
Meredith Monk (artist-in-residence)
Butch Morris (artist-in-residence)
Michael Nicolella
Hossein Omoumi (artist-in-residence)
Frank J. Oteri (artist-in-residence)
Gary Peacock
Julian Priester
Jovino Santos Neto
Seattle Chamber Players (artist-in-residence)
Adam Stern
Stephen Stubbs
Paul Taub
Tom Varner
Linda Waterfall
Melia Watras (artist-in-residence)
Matt Wilson (artist-in-residence)

Dance 

Merce Cunningham
Seán Curran (artist-in-residence)
David Dorfman (artist-in-residence)
Bill Evans (artist-in-residence)
Syvilla Fort (artist-in-residence)
David Gordon (artist-in-residence)
Martha Graham
Alonzo King (artist-in-residence)
Ralph Lemon (artist-in-residence)
Liz Lerman (artist-in-residence)
Donald McKayle (artist-in-residence)
Bebe Miller (artist-in-residence)
Mark Morris (artist-in-residence)
Steve Paxton (artist-in-residence)
Elizabeth Streb (artist-in-residence)
Twyla Tharp (artist-in-residence)
Jennifer Tipton (artist-in-residence)

Design 
Ellen Forney

 Guest and visiting artists
 Ping Chong (artist in residence)
 Hand2Mouth Theatre, Portland, OR

Performance production

Fine art 

John Butler
William Cumming
Imogen Cunningham (artist-in-residence)
Thomas J. Duffy
Jesse Edwards
Morris Graves
Gary Hill
Charles Stokes
Mark Tobey
Windsor Utley
Ron Wigginton

Notable alumni

Dance 

Merce Cunningham
Ann Reinking

Music 

Magdalen Hsu-Li
Mary Lambert
Karyna McGlynn
Todd McHatton
Patrick O'Hearn
Reggie Watts
Steve White of The Blue Man Group
Frances Williams
Michael Wilton

Theater 
 Wolfe Bowart (clown, physical theater writer, performer)
 Brendan Fraser (actor) 
 David Gasman (actor, director, voiceover artist)
 Chet Huntley (NBC broadcast legend)
 C.S. Lee (actor, Showtime's Dexter)
 Jinkx Monsoon (Jerick Hoffer) (actor, singer)
 Lady Rizo, also known as Amelia Rose Zirin-Brown (cabaret performer-actor)

Fine art 

Clayton Lewis, painter and sculptor 
James McMullan
Felicia Oh
Mark Velasquez
Ron Wigginton

Film 

 Colleen Atwood, costume designer, three-time Academy Award winner

See also

 List of people from Seattle

References

Cornish College of the Arts alumni